West River is a rural municipality in the Canadian province of Prince Edward Island within Queens County.

History 
The Municipality of West River was originally incorporated in 1974. It incorporated as a rural municipality on January 1, 2018. On September 1, 2020, the Rural Municipality of West River amalgamated with the rural municipalities of Afton, Bonshaw, Meadowbank, and New Haven-Riverdale. The amalgamated municipality was named the Rural Municipality of West River.

Geography 
Prior to the amalgamation, localities within West River included Canoe Cove, Long Creek, New Argyle, and St. Catherines.

Demographics 

See also 
List of communities in Prince Edward Island

References 

Communities in Queens County, Prince Edward Island
Rural municipalities in Prince Edward Island